The Battle of  my refer to:

Battle of Aubervilliers (1814) (30 March), was a probing attack by the Prussians on the defensive lines north of Paris during the Battle of Paris
Battle of Aubervilliers (1815) (29 June), was a probing attack by the Prussians on the French defensive lines north of Paris during the Waterloo Campaign